Raphanin is the main sulfur component found in radish seeds of Raphanus sativus and is also found in broccoli and red cabbage. It was first described in 1947.

Basic research
In vitro, raphanin inhibits some fungi and various bacteria including Staphylococcus, Streptococcus, Pneumococcus and Escherichia coli.

See also 
 Raffinose
 Sulforaphane

References 

Antibiotics
Isothiocyanates